"All I Have" is a song by American singer Jennifer Lopez, featuring American rapper LL Cool J. Written by Lopez, Makeba Riddick, Curtis Richardson, and Ron G and produced by Cory Rooney, Ron G, and Dave McPherson, it was released on December 14, 2002, as the second single from Lopez's third studio album, This Is Me... Then (2002).

"All I Have" samples "Very Special" by Debra Laws, who later filed a lawsuit in 2003 against Sony Music Entertainment for "misappropriating her voice" in the song and her name in the credits. The song is a midtempo R&B and hip-hop ballad, about moving on after a breakup. It received favorable reviews from music critics who applauded the chemistry between Lopez and LL Cool J. "All I Have" also samples the "baby don't go" verse from the Joe single "Stutter".

The song was a success on the charts, reaching number one in the United States (becoming Lopez's last number one as of ) and in New Zealand, and it entered the top 10 in several countries. After the success of "All I Have" with LL Cool J, the track was included on the re-issue of his album 10. The song was ranked as the 15th-most-successful song on the Billboard Hot 100 of 2003 and in 2011, Billboard named the song the 34th Biggest Duet of All Time. Lopez named her 2016 Las Vegas Residency Show, All I Have, after the song.

Background and release

On October 19, 2002, American rapper LL Cool J revealed that he had just recorded a song for Lopez's then-upcoming album two days prior, saying: "We did a new song for her album. Well it's actually going to be her next single, I think – it's a lot of fun, a lot of fun." He stated that, "It's got like a mid-tempo beat, pretty melody, you know what I'm saying. I'm rapping, she's singing. We go back and forth with stuff. It's kind of cool, it's fly."

Initially, Lopez did not want "All I Have" to be released as a single, as she believed it was too musically similar to her previous singles such as "Ain't It Funny" and "I'm Real"; she felt like she was "visiting old territory". "Those tracks were like a different era for me, and I didn't want people to perceive it like I'm just trying to capitalize on the same thing. But the record company was like, 'Who cares what they think, those are hits mama!'". Lopez, who said she "calls the shots", eventually agreed.

The song was officially sent to urban radio in the United States on December 14, 2002, as the second single from This Is Me... Then. It was later released on March 10, 2003, in the United Kingdom and Australia.

Composition

"All I Have" was written by Lopez, James Todd Smith, Makeba Riddick, Curtis Richardson, Ron G, and Dave McPherson while production was handled by Cory Rooney, Ron G, and McPherson. Recorded at The Hit Factory in New York City, the song was originally titled "I'm Good" and heavily samples Debra Laws's song "Very Special", written by Lisa Peters and William Jeffrey. Featuring LL Cool J, "All I Have" is a midtempo R&B and hip hop ballad about moving on after a break up. On the track, Lopez decides to end her relationship due to her lover's infidelity, while LL Cool J attempts to "make up" with her.

Critical response
MTV observed the song to conjure up her own public split with P. Diddy. Amy Sciarretto of PopCrush characterized Lopez's vocals as "cooed" and found the song to have a "classic feel", with LL Cool J heard rapping, grunting and pleading "Baby don't go" over a "subtle" urban beat. Tom Sinclair of Entertainment Weekly praised LL Cool J as being a "high-spirited guest" on the song, while Sal Cinquemani of Slant Magazine wrote that both "playfully interpolate Debra and Ronnie Laws' 'Very Special'." About.com's Bill Lamb wrote, "There is a relaxed, charming elegance here that sounds timeless." Sam Lansky of MTV Buzzworthy described the duet as "icy-cool". Erika Ramirez of Vibe wrote that the song "deftly conceals Lopez's whispery sighs, but she still generates heat with partner LL on this effervescent collabo".

Chart performance
For the week of December 28, 2002, "All I Have" entered the US Billboard Hot 100 at number 25, earning the "Hot Shot Debut" of the week. It not only became highest-debuting song of Lopez's career at the time, but was also the highest-debuting song on the chart since September 2001. For the week of January 30, 2003, the single reached number one on the Hot 100, giving Lopez her fourth and LL Cool J his first number one song on the chart. It was also the Hot 100's fastest-growing track at radio. It remained at the summit of the Hot 100 for four weeks, later being displaced by 50 Cent's "In Da Club". It also attained the top position on the Pop Songs chart, and it reached number four on the Hot R&B/Hip-Hop Songs chart. Due to the song's success, LL Cool J included it on a reissue of his album 10 (2002). This allowed the album to register a 491% week-to-week sales gain and re-enter the top ten of the US Billboard 200, jumping from number 84 to number nine for the issue dated February 22, 2003. "All I Have" is Lopez's most recent song to top the Hot 100.

On the UK Singles Chart, "All I Have" peaked at number two, becoming Lopez's highest-charting single there since "Love Don't Cost a Thing", which reached number one the previous year. Years later, Lopez's collaboration with LL Cool J on his track "Control Myself" also peaked at number two, on May 13, 2006. In New Zealand, "All I Have" debuted at number 42 on the RIANZ chart, on March 2, 2003. After climbing to number 35 and 33, the song climbed to number two, while the next week the song peaked at number one, becoming Lopez's third number-one single. It was later certified Gold by the Recording Industry Association of New Zealand, for sales of 7,500 copies. In Australia, the song debuting at number three on the ARIA Charts, becoming her fastest debut there. It later spent three weeks at number five, before climbing and remaining for two weeks at number four. Finally, the song peaked at number two on May 4, 2003. It was later certified platinum by the Australian Recording Industry Association, for selling over 70,000 units.

Music video
The music video for "All I Have" was directed by Dave Meyers, and was shot in New York City in November 2002. MTV News revealed that Lopez and LL Cool J would be playing ex-lovers in the music video. According to a synopsis provided by Meyers' production company, "They keep seeing visions of each other, and you get the feeling that they are still very much in love, yet they don't get back together because they feel that this is the best thing for them. It will have a very happy winter wonderland-type feel, but a sad vibe." The video was shot right before Thanksgiving, but did not premiere on television until after Christmas.

The video features Lopez and LL as former lovers now broken up. The two recall the good and bad times while dealing with being alone for the holidays. Lopez shows up to LL's house with a gift. With him not there, she puts the gift under the tree. He later sees the gift under the tree and realizes it was from Lopez. He opens the gift and sees a golden key. Upset at the relationship being over, he throws the key in the fireplace while a tearful Lopez gets help from her friends with her things.

The music video became one of the most played clips on networks such as MTV, VH1 and BET. While analyzing her DVD The Reel Me, Jason Shawhan of About.com called it a "Christmastime breakup theme" and "a nice shout-out to "No Me Ames" in terms of its hyperexaggerated emotions, but the most notable aspect of the audiovisual experience is the Debra Laws's "Very Special" sample which runs counterpoint to the Lopez/LL Cool J interplay."

Live performances

Lopez and LL Cool J performed "All I Have" on The Today Show for the episode dated December 6, 2002. The performance took place during her concert at Kips Bay High School, Lopez's alma mater. The song was included on the set list for her Dance Again World Tour (2012), including the song as part of a "Back-to-Bronx" hip hop medley.

Lopez included the song on the set list for her 2016 Las Vegas residency show, Jennifer Lopez: All I Have. She performed it as a duet with surprise guest Ne-Yo during the show's opening night on January 20, 2016, with Ne-Yo taking on LL Cool J's verses. The two also covered "Very Special" together. Prince Royce joined Lopez on stage days later during another night of the residency, where the two performed "Very Special" and "All I Have". Lopez later performed the song as part of her medley during the 2018 MTV Video Music Awards on August 20, 2018, at Radio City Music Hall in New York City.

Accolades
The song was nominated for two Teen Choice Awards in 2003 on the categories, "Choice Music Single" and "Choice Music Hook-Up", but lost it for Avril Lavigne's "Sk8er Boi" and 50 Cent and Nate Dogg's "21 Questions", respectively. In May 2003, "All I Have" received a BDSCertified Spin Award, signifying 200,000 radio spins. In 2004, it received an ASCAP Pop Music Award and a BMI Pop Award.

Lawsuit
In March 2003, Debra Laws sued Sony Music Entertainment/Epic Records in the United States District Court for the Central District of California, claiming that the use of samples from "Very Special" without her consent (even though the writers of "Very Special" and Elektra Entertainment Group—successor to Elektra/Asylum Records, which had released the original recording of "Very Special"—had given their consent to the use of the samples) violated her statutory and common law right of publicity under California law. In November 2003, Judge Lourdes Baird granted Sony Music's motion for summary judgment on the ground that Laws's state law claims were preempted by Section 301 of the United States Copyright Act. In 2006, that decision was affirmed by the United States Court of Appeals for the Ninth Circuit.

Track listings

Canadian CD single
 "All I Have" (album version) – 4:15
 "Jenny from the Block" (Seismic Crew's Latin Disco Trip) – 6:41
 "Jenny from the Block" (Everbots Showtime mix) – 6:00

UK CD1
 "All I Have" (album version) – 4:15
 "All I Have" (instrumental) – 4:15
 "Loving You" (album version) – 3:46
 "All I Have" (video version)

UK CD2
 "All I Have" (album version) – 4:15
 "Jenny from the Block" (Seismic Crew's Latin Disco Trip) – 6:41
 "Jenny from the Block" (Everbots Showtime mix radio edit) – 3:44

UK cassette single
 "All I Have" (album version) – 4:15
 "Jenny from the Block" (Everbots Showtime mix) – 6:00

European CD1
 "All I Have" (radio edit) – 4:00
 "Jenny from the Block" (Seismic Crew's Latin Disco Trip radio edit) – 3:26

European CD2
 "All I Have" (album version) – 4:15
 "Jenny from the Block" (Everbots Showtime mix radio edit version 2) – 3:44
 "Jenny from the Block" (Seismic Crew's Latin Disco Trip radio edit) – 3:26
 "Loving You" (album version) – 3:46
 "All I Have" (instrumental) – 4:15
 "All I Have" (video)

Australian CD single
 "All I Have" (album version) – 4:15
 "Jenny from the Block" (Everbots Showtime mix) – 6:00
 "Jenny from the Block" (Seismic Crew's Latin Disco Trip radio edit) – 3:26
 "Loving You" (album version) – 3:46

Charts

Weekly charts

Year-end charts

Certifications

Release history

References

2000s ballads
2002 singles
2002 songs
2003 singles
Billboard Hot 100 number-one singles
Contemporary R&B ballads
Epic Records singles
Jennifer Lopez songs
LL Cool J songs
Music videos directed by Dave Meyers (director)
Number-one singles in New Zealand
Sampling controversies
Song recordings produced by Cory Rooney
Songs written by Jennifer Lopez
Songs written by LL Cool J
Songs written by Makeba Riddick
Songs about heartache